Margaret Burke Sheridan (15 October 1889 – 16 April 1958) was an Irish opera singer. Born in Castlebar, County Mayo, Ireland, she was known as Maggie from Mayo and is regarded as Ireland's second prima donna, after Catherine Hayes (1818–1861).

Career
Sheridan had her early vocal training while at school at the Dominican Convent in Eccles Street, Dublin, with additional lessons from Vincent O'Brien. In 1908, she won a gold medal at the Feis Ceoil. From 1909 to 1911 she studied at the Royal Academy of Music in London, during which time she was introduced to the Italian inventor Guglielmo Marconi, who was instrumental in arranging further studies for her in opera in Rome. With Marconi's help she auditioned in 1916 for Alfredo Martino, a prominent singing teacher attached to the Teatro Costanzi, and she made her début there in January 1918 in Puccini's La Bohème. In July 1919 she appeared at the Royal Opera House (Covent Garden) in the title role in Iris by Pietro Mascagni. Sheridan returned to Italy, where her career continued to grow, with performances at the Teatro Dal Verme in Milan and at the Teatro San Carlo in Naples, primarily in Puccini roles. In 1922 she first sang at La Scala, Milan, in La Wally by Catalani under the direction of Toscanini. For the next few years she would sing at La Scala with great success. Perhaps her greatest role was Madama Butterfly, which she sang extensively in Italy and at Covent Garden. When she played the part of Madama Butterfly, Puccini was said to be spellbound.

Late years
Despite her successes, Sheridan's career was short. Suffering vocal difficulties she went into retirement around 1930 except for a few concerts. Bríd Mahon, in her 1998 book While Green Grass Grows, p. 123, states that: "It was rumoured that an Italian whose overtures she had rejected had blown his brains out in a box in La Scala, Milan, while she was on stage and that after the tragedy she never sang in public again." She died in relative obscurity, having lived in Dublin for many years, and her remains were buried in Glasnevin Cemetery, Dublin.

Recordings
Sheridan made a complete recording of Madama Butterfly with the La Scala orchestra during 1929–30 on gramophone records, also a number of recordings of operatic duets with the tenor Aureliano Pertile, as well as arias from selected operas by Michael William Balfe, Arrigo Boito, Giacomo Puccini, Giuseppe Verdi and Richard Wagner. She also recorded various Irish traditional song arrangements by Balfe, John William Glover, Thomas Moore and others.

Bibliography
C. O'Brien, L. Lustig & A. Kelly: "Margaret Burke Sheridan", in: Record Collector vol. 33 (1988), pp. 187–213.
Ann Chambers: La Sheridan, Adorable Diva. Margaret Burke Sheridan, Irish Prima-Donna, 1889–1958 (Dublin: Wolfhound Press, 1989), .

See also
 List of people on stamps of Ireland

References

External links

 Biography
 

1889 births
1958 deaths
20th-century Irish women opera singers
Irish sopranos
Musicians from County Mayo
People from Castlebar
Burials at Glasnevin Cemetery